The Widening Gyre is a 1983 novel by Robert B. Parker, featuring his private detective character Spenser. The title comes from the first line of W.B. Yeats poem "The Second Coming".

Story 
Spenser is hired to head up the security detail for Congressman Meade Alexander as he runs for the Senate.  The congressman confides to Spenser that he is being blackmailed by someone who wants him to drop out of the senate race.  The congressman's wife Ronni drinks too much and there is an explicit sex tape of her and a much younger man.
Spenser's assignment is to get the original tape and stop the blackmail before Ronni finds out.  His investigation leads to Joe Broz's son Gerry and dealing with the Broz organization is always potentially lethal.

Characters
Spenser
Susan Silverman
Hawk
Martin Quirk
Congressman Meade Alexander
Ronni Alexander
Congressman Robert Browne
Gerry Broz
Joe Broz
Vinnie Morris

References 

1983 American novels
Spenser (novel series)
Blackmail